Mattathipara is a village, part of Kadanad grama panchayathu in Palai Assembly constituency, Kottayam district and Karimkunnam grama panchayathu in Thodupuzha Assembly constituency, Idukki district, Kerala, India.

 
The flourishing of Mattathippara began in the 1970s with the entry of rubber plants. Agriculturists who cultivate rubber with paddy and other crops.

Perumkunnu hills also located in Mattathipara.Starting point of pampanal waterfalls in perumkunnu hills.

Institutions

 Holy Cross Church, Golgotha
 Sree Dharmasastha Devi Temple (2 km from town) Neeloor Ampala bhagam
 Holy Cross U.P School
 JaiHind Public Library
 Govt.Ayurvedic Hospital
 Kadanad Service Co-Operative Bank 
 SMMI Convent
 Mattathippara Post Office (Pin-686651)
 Veterinary Dispensary 
 Anganwadi 
 Primary Health Center

Transportation
Mattathippara is connected by roads to the nearby towns Neeloor and Karimkunnam. There is no railway line passing through Mattathippara. The nearest major railway station is in Kottayam (52 km).
The nearest airport is Cochin International Airport at a distance of 75 kilometres.

A very interesting fact of Mattathippara is that there is a bus owned by villagers named Jenakiyan. It is the result of a group effort under the guidance of Fr. Thomas Paruthippara in 2008. The drivers and conductors of Janakeeyan are the villagers themselves.

Main road routes to reach Mattathippara

 Palai - Kollappally - Kurumannu -Neeloor -> Mattathippara
 Thodupuzha - Karimkunnam -> Mattathippara
 Palai - Kollappally- Karimkunnam -> Mattathippara
 Palai/Thodupuzha- Manathoor -> Mattathippara
 Muttom - Neeloor- Mattathippra

Politics
Mattathipara is part of the Kottayam and part of Idukki Lok Sabha constituency and Palai Assembly Constituency (Mattathipara was one of the parts of Poonjar Assembly Constituency until 2011) and Thodupuzha Assembly Constituency. Kerala Congress (M) member Shri. Jose K. Mani is the present MP from Kottayam and Indian National Congress member Shri. Dean Kuriakose is the present MP from Idukki. Shri. Mani C. Kappan is the MLA of Palai Assembly Constituency and Shri. P.J Joseph is the MLA of Thodupuzha Assembly Constituency.

The main political parties are:

 Indian National Congress
 Kerala Congress (M)
 Kerala Congress (Joseph)
 BJP
 Aam Admi Party
 CPI(M)

Closest cities, towns and villages
 Perumkunnumala is a beautiful place to visit, from which three districts can be seen. People from many places visit Mattathippara to enjoy the beauty. Prumkunnumala is at a higher altitude. One of the cross of Holy Cross Sunday School, Gagultha is also situated there. On every Good Friday a practice of 'KURISHINTE VAZHI' is conducted from the Holy Cross church to Perumkunnumala.
 Palai (23 km)
 Thodupuzha (13 km)
 Neeloor (4 km)
 Karimkunnam (6 km)
 Manathoor (3 km)

References

Villages in Kottayam district